Woman is a studio album by Nancy Sinatra, released on RCA Victor in 1972.

Track listing

Personnel
Credits adapted from liner notes.

 Nancy Sinatra – vocals
 Larry Muhoberac – arrangement
 Jimmy Bowen – production

References

External links
 
 

1972 albums
Nancy Sinatra albums
Albums produced by Jimmy Bowen
RCA Records albums